The Northern Finance Association (NFA) is a learned society consisting of academic researchers in finance. It is federally incorporated as a not-for-profit organization in Canada. It hosts an annual conference in Autumn. The conferences are always in Canada, but participants come from around the world. Typically, one-third of the participants are from Canada, one-third from the United States and the final third from the rest of the world.

References

External links 
 Northern Finance Association

Academic organizations based in Canada